Natural Dam is an unincorporated community in Crawford County, Arkansas, United States. Natural Dam has a post office with ZIP code 72948. The now-replaced Lee Creek Bridge, which was listed on the National Register of Historic Places, was located in the community.

The community was named for a natural dam near the original town site.

Notable person
 Shay Mooney, half of country duo Dan + Shay

References

Unincorporated communities in Crawford County, Arkansas
Unincorporated communities in Arkansas